Graeme Hatcher (born 11 February 1957) is a former Australian rules footballer who played with Essendon in the Victorian Football League (VFL). He later played with Clarence in Tasmania, and was then captain-coach of several Victorian country sides – Hopetoun, Woomelang-Lascelles and Warracknabeal.

Notes

External links 
		

Essendon Football Club past player profile

Living people
1957 births
Australian rules footballers from Victoria (Australia)
Essendon Football Club players
Warracknabeal Football Club players
Clarence Football Club players